Richard de Wentworth was a medieval Bishop of London.

Wentworth was a canon of St. Paul's when he was named Lord Privy Seal on 25 March 1337, holding that office until early July 1338.

Wentworth was elected bishop on 4 May 1338 and consecrated on 12 July 1338.

Wentworth was named Lord Chancellor of England on 6 July 1338 and held that office until his death.

Wentworth died on 8 December 1339.

Citations

References
 

Bishops of London
Lords Privy Seal
1339 deaths
Lord chancellors of England
Year of birth unknown
14th-century English Roman Catholic bishops